Sampath Raj (born 25 December 1968) is an Indian actor who works predominantly in Tamil and Telugu films, in addition to Kannada and Malayalam films. He is best known for appearing in each film of director Venkat Prabhu's trilogy, consisting of Chennai 600028, Saroja and Goa. He has also acted in supporting roles in various other films. He is mostly known in negative roles. He has played a brief role as Ekambram in Malgudi Days for the episode "Neighbors Help", which was directed by Kavitha Lankesh. After a sabbatical, he returned to Kannada cinema with the film Shourya (2010).

Filmography

Film

Television

References

External links
 

Male actors in Tamil cinema
Indian male film actors
Male actors in Kannada cinema
Living people
Male actors in Malayalam cinema
1968 births
Place of birth missing (living people)
21st-century Indian male actors
Male actors from Lucknow
Male actors in Telugu cinema